The Scottish Left Review is a bi-monthly magazine publication of the Scottish left.  It was established in 2000 by several prominent left-wing figures, including Bob Thomson, Henry McCubbin, Jimmy Reid, Roseanna Cunningham, and John McAllion. Contributions come from members of all parties of the Scottish left and none. In 2006, it established the Scottish Left Review Press - which has published the best selling 'Is there a Scottish road to socialism?' edited collection - and in 2010 it also established the Jimmy Reid Foundation.

Throughout an often difficult and challenging time for left politics in Scotland (over Tommy Sheridan, the rise of the SNP, the independence referendum and so on), the magazine has continued to hold true to its historical mission of acting as a respectful and rigorous forum for debate and discussion across the left with a view to propounding progressive politics and mapping out strategies to achieve them.

Its current editorial committee consists of Cat Boyd, academic and author Gregor Gall, Bob Thomson, Gordon Morgan, Sarah Collins, Dave Sherry, Stephen Smellie, Lilian Macer, Tommy Sheppard, Moira Craig and Bill Bonnar. The magazine was edited by Robin McAlpine from the early 2000s until mid-2014. It is now edited by Gregor Gall.

The magazine survives through a combination of pay for subscriptions for the hard copy of the magazine, advertising from unions and progressive organisation and donations from readers and supporters.

Visits to the magazine's website run into the hundreds of thousands. For example, in January 2016, the website had 268,000 hits and 30,000 visits with  a median of 5 pages read per visit. This meant readership had more than doubled in the last 3 years.

External links
Scottish Left Review Website
Jimmy Reid Foundation website

Bi-monthly magazines published in the United Kingdom
Political magazines published in Scotland
Magazines established in 2000
Socialism in Scotland
Magazines published in Scotland
Socialist magazines
2000 establishments in Scotland